"Ride on Time" is a song by the Italian dance group Black Box. It was released as a single in July 1989 and included on Black Box's debut album, Dreamland (1990).

The Black Box member Daniele Davioli described "Ride on Time" as an attempt to create a dance track with the power of a rock song. The first version used an unlicensed vocal sample from the 1980 single "Love Sensation" by Loleatta Holloway. After the copyright owners took legal action, the single was reissued with rerecorded vocals by Heather Small, who later found fame as the vocalist of M People. For television appearances, Black Box hired the model Katrin Quinol to mime the vocals.

In Italy, "Ride on Time" was released by Discomagic Records. In the UK, it was released by Deconstruction and popularised by the DJs Paul Oakenfold and Danny Rampling. It topped the UK Singles Chart for six weeks and became the UK's bestselling single of 1989. It also topped the charts in Iceland and Ireland, and entered the top 10 of several other European countries. "Ride on Time" has appeared in critics' lists of the best house tracks, and in 2020 the Guardian named it one of the greatest UK number ones.

Recording
"Ride on Time" was written and produced by the Italian production team Groove Groove Melody, comprising Daniele Davoli, Mirko Limoni and Valerio Semplici. Davoli visited New York City and bought a 12-inch acapella of "Love Sensation", a 1980 single by Loleatta Holloway, planning to use it to create mashups. In Italy, he was introduced to samplers, and persuaded the club where he worked to buy an Akai S900 sampler. He created the first version of "Ride on Time" using the S900 to sample the "Love Sensation" vocals.

Limoni added piano chords and additional vocal samples. Davoli said that as Italian rock music was not taken seriously, "Ride on Time" was the group's attempt to create a song with the power of Led Zeppelin and Deep Purple with a dance beat. They finished the basic backing track in less than an hour, but it took weeks to finalise the ordering of the samples. Davoli tested the track in a club, but the audience responded poorly: "It was heartbreaking. The floor had 1,000 people dancing, and it cleared it." However, his bandmates assured him that it was "the wrong club".

The song title derives from the sampled lyric "Thank you baby, 'cause you're right on time". Davoli explained that, owing to his limited knowledge of English and to Holloway's American accent, he thought the line was "ride on time".

Release
Black Box showed "Ride on Time" to numerous Italian record labels, but none were interested, feeling it did not match their markets. Finally, Davoli took it to Discomagic Records, who he said "would release almost anything".

Shortly after the track was finished, the British DJs Paul Oakenfold and Danny Rampling visited Italy looking for Italo house music. They heard an early pressing of "Ride on Time" in a record shop, purchased all the copies and brought them to England. Around the same time, the UK record label Deconstruction contacted Discomagic, interested in licensing Black Box's earlier track "Numero Uno", but it had been licensed to Beggars Banquet. Instead, Deconstruction licensed "Ride on Time" and released it with no promotion, competing with the imported copies arriving in UK record stores.

"Ride on Time" was included on Black Box's debut album Dreamland (1990). In 2019, for the song's 30th anniversary, Black Box created a new mix in the style of a 1970s disco track.

Sampling dispute

Deconstruction was concerned about clearing the "Love Sensation" sample, which was owned by Salsoul Records. Davoli mistakenly believed Holloway was dead and that sampling less than two seconds of copyrighted music without permission was legal. Dan Hartman, who wrote "Love Sensation", asked for a third of the royalties. Although Black Box initially baulked at the offer, they later learnt Hartman could have asked for 100%, and Davoli said he had been "a true gentleman".

After negotiations worsened with Salsoul, BMG, which owned Deconstruction, had Black Box record a replacement vocal. The new vocalist was Heather Small, who later found fame as the singer of M People. Small was not told what the purpose of the recording was, and recorded her vocals within an hour for a flat fee. According to Davoli, BMG were secretive about her identity even with Black Box, saying it was "a singer doing them a favour, someone who hadn't released any music yet but was a big priority for BMG for the future". BMG refused to confirm Small had provided the vocal even after M People became successful.

Within a week of Small recording the vocal, Deconstruction withdrew the single and released a new version on the Ride on Time (Remix) EP, which counted towards sales of the original song. The edited track appeared on the EP as the "Massive Mix". Radio stations continued to play the original version, and it continued to appear on some versions of Dreamland and compilation albums.

According to Davoli, Holloway was never paid for "Ride on Time", as the sample was owned by Salsoul. However, the music journalist James Masterton reported that she reached a settlement over the track and bought a fur coat with the proceeds. Holloway said: "I've been around for years trying to get this one hit record. It annoyed me knowing that Black Box were number one and I was not getting any credit for it." Davoli said he regretted not meeting Holloway before her death in 2011, and would have liked to apologise "for how messy things got". Black Box bought the rights to the "Love Sensation" sample in 2018.

Miming 
When Black Box were invited to perform on the British music series Top of the Pops, they hired the model Katrin Quinol to mime the vocals, as "none of us three blokes from Italy would be convincing replacements for Loleatta Holloway". Quinol also appeared in the music video and other performances. Davoli said, "You could tell those vocals didn't come from a slim girl like her. But she had a great influence on the public – she had the moves on stage and looked great and of the time."

The miming drew criticism, which surprised the band, as it was normal on Italian television. Davoli later said he regretted using Quinol: "It was wrong. But in Italy, a lot of people used to sing on a record and labels would ask young people to become the image ... We looked at American and English artists and realised they don't do that." The group allowed Quinol to perform in Europe under the Black Box name.

Sales
"Ride on Time" entered the UK Singles Chart at number 28 in the week of 12 August 1989. Boosted by demand for the import, it reached number one in its fifth week, on 3 September 1989. It topped the chart for six weeks, and became the UK's bestselling single of 1989. 

"Ride on Time" also reached number one in Iceland and Ireland, number two in Sweden and Greece, and entered the top ten in Austria, Belgium, Finland, France, Italy, Norway, Spain, Switzerland and West Germany. It reached number four on the Eurochart Hot 100, a chart based on the singles charts of 17 European countries. In Australia and New Zealand, "Ride on Time" reached number two. In the United States, it reached number 39 on the Hot Dance Club Play chart. 

As of 2018, "Ride on Time" had been streamed over nine million times on Spotify. It is certified gold in Sweden, silver in France and platinum in Australia and the UK.

Reception
Reviewing Dreamland in 1990, Andrew Smith from Melody Maker felt that "there must be scarcely a person in the world who doesn't already hold an opinion on "Ride on Time". My own is that "Theme from S'Express", which the bassline was whipped from, is far superior and that those bombastic sampled vocals are a tad irritating." Chris Heath from Smash Hits described the song as "quite brilliant". Daily Vault reviewer Michael R. Smith wrote in his 2009 review of Dreamland that he did not like the song when it became a hit, "though now I recognize how effective and timeless these tunes really are. Maybe it was the fact that they were overplayed to death back then. Now that a lot of time has passed, they sound fresher and fuller of life than ever."

In 2010, Tom Ewing of Freaky Trigger described "Ride On Time" as "a series of peaks, with the union of 'Right on time!' and the piano riff the highest and most thrilling". He added that Holloway "isn't doing all the work. The trappings of Italo house – light, sequenced keyboard lines, bouncy bass, endless hi-hat all working in unison to give that gorgeous piano its lift – seemed to be on a hundred hits that summer, and the vocal hooks made this the biggest." In 2011, the music journalist James Masterton wrote that Small's replacement vocal was "almost comically bad", with a noticeable Manchester accent. He lamented that Holloway was remembered for a track that did not feature her vocals on most copies.
 
Fact included "Ride on Time" in its 2014 list of "diva-house belters that still sound incredible", writing: "Some people see this as a guilty pleasure now. Those people are fools. Banging piano + Loleatta Holloway = world changing greatness." Mixmag included it in their 2019 list of the 20 best diva house tracks, writing that its "overall feel and wailing vocal accompaniment still bangs to this day and it is considered one of the first high-profile examples of italo house". In 2020, The Guardian named it the 67th greatest UK number one, writing: "Heather Small blows the house down ... This is a Terminator of a song, unstoppably delivering a payload of pure euphoria as Chicago house is spliced with Italo disco to create perfect pop."

Accolades

(*) indicates the list is unordered.

Track listings

UK 12" maxi (1989)
"Ride on Time" (massive mix) – 6:37
"Ride on Time" (Epsom mix) – 5:28
"Ride on Time" (Ascot mix) – 2:50

UK CD maxi (1989)
"Ride on Time" (massive mix) (7” edit) – 4:10
"Ride on Time" (Epsom mix) – 5:28
"Ride on Time" (Ascot mix) – 2:50

UK second CD maxi & 12" maxi (1989)
"Ride on Time" (massive mix) (remix) - 6:37
"Ride on Time" (Epsom mix) (remix) - 5:25
"Ride on Time" (Ascot mix) (remix) – 2:57

West German CD maxi & 12" maxi (1989)
"Ride on Time" (the original) – 6:27
"Ride on Time" (garage trip) – 6:05
"Ride on Time" (piano version) – 2:53

UK 7" single (1989)
"Ride on Time" (massive mix) (7” edit) – 4:10
"Ride on Time" (Epsom mix) (7” edit) – 2:57

UK second 7" single (1989)
"Ride on Time" (massive mix) (remix 7” edit) - 4:10
"Ride on Time" (Epsom mix) (remix 7” edit) – 2:57

West German 7" single (1989)
"Ride on Time" (the original) (7” edit) – 3:55
"Ride on Time" (piano version) – 2:53

West German CD maxi (2003)
"Ride on Time" (radio cut) – 3:06
"Ride on Time" (extended club mix) – 5:54
"Ride on Time" (Voltaxx dub remix) – 5:57
"Ride on Time" (original version) – 6:27
"Ride on Time" (exacto mix) – 6:38
"Ride on Time" (Snapshot remix) – 6:38
"Ride on Time" (Jay Jay radio cold mix) – 3:45

Charts and certifications

Weekly charts

Year-end charts

Certifications and sales

See also
List of number-one singles of 1989 (Ireland)
List of UK Singles Chart number ones of the 1980s
List of best-selling singles by year in the United Kingdom

References

1989 singles
1989 songs
Black Box (band) songs
Deconstruction Records singles
Irish Singles Chart number-one singles
Songs written by Dan Hartman
UK Singles Chart number-one singles